Greystone Books is a Canadian book publisher. Initially an imprint of Douglas & McIntyre, the Vancouver-based company became its own entity in 2013.

History 
Greystone Books was an imprint of Douglas & McIntyre, and won the CBA Libris Award for Marketing Achievement of the Year in 2007. After Douglas & McIntyre went bankrupt in 2013, publisher Rob Sanders bought Greystone Books and launched it as an in independent company.

In 2017, the company won the Jim Douglas Publisher of the Year Award. In 2019, the company launched the Greystone Kids and its Aldana Libros imprint to focus on English translations of global children's book titles. Patsy Aldana is the publisher of Aldana Libros. 

Jen Gauthier took over as publisher of Greystone Books on January 1, 2022.

Activities 
The company is based in Vancouver, and is known for its publication of English language books about people, the planet, and nature.

References 

2013 establishments in British Columbia
Book publishing companies of Canada
Companies established in 2013
Companies based in Vancouver